Mustafa El-Rifai (born 23 January 1934) was a Minister of Industry and Technology from 1999 to 2001. Chairman and CEO of Enppi ( Engineering For The Petroleum and Procees Industries ) from 1980 to 1990.

Contributions

Ministry Of Industry 

 As Minister of Industry and Technological Development launched a number of Specific Industries Technology Centers to modernize certain industrial sectors. 
 Under his administration, complete documentation of all industrial companies and plants was completed in the Industrial Information Center.
 Also, State Agencies responsible for serving industry and controlling quality were upgraded in resources, caliber of personnel, and systems.
 Food quality specs were strictly enforced adopting US and European Standards.
 Several initiatives were made to promote the exploitation of minerals in Egypt.

ENPPI 

 Pioneered the establishment of a world class multi-discipline EPC engineering company that Contracts oil, gas, process, and offshore projects.
 Population has grown since to exceed 2000.

SONATRACH & ADNOC 

 Services to promote  the realization of major oil projects in Algeria and UAE.

UNIDO 

 Contribution to the development of Capital Goods Industry in Mexico as UNIDO consultant.
 Contributions as UNIDO expert to assist developing countries to conclude more equitable Technology Transfer Agreements.

US. Patent
 Inventor of US Patent number 3,248,241 on New Highly Impervious Refractories.

APET 
 Is currently pursuing the technology mission with other members of APET, a newly registered Society (NGO).

Biography

 Minister of Industry and Technology 1999-2001.
 Chairman and CEO of Enppi 1980-1990.
 Vice Chairman of the Egyptian General Petroleum Corporation (EGPC) 1990.
 Member of the Board of Trustees of the Egyptian Foundation for Technology Education (EFTED) 2013
 Chairman of the Board of The Egyptian Association for Pioneers of Engineering & Technology ( APET ) since November 2012
 Member of the Egyptian Council for Economic Affairs, 2013
 ETMAM CEO 1993-1999.
 Senior Consultant, Abu Dhabi National Oil Company (ADNOC), 1990/91.
 Conseiller Technique, SONATRACH, Algeria, 1968-1974.
 Research Engineer, Textile Fibers Department, E.I du Pont de Nemours & Co., Wilmington, Del., USA 1960-1965.
 UNIDO Consultant on Capital Goods, Petrochemicals, and Licensing of Patents.
 Director of Refining, Petrochemical Projects and Engineering Services, Suez Oil Processing Company 1974-1980.
 Member, Supreme Council of the National Academy of Science, Research and Technology, 1984-1990.
 Member of the Board, Egyptian General Petroleum Corporation, EGPC, 1985-1990.
 Member of the Board, Alexandria Tire Company, 1995-1999.
 Member of the Board, Egyptian Petroleum Research Institute, 1984-1990.
 Petrochemicals Pilot Company, Deputy Chairman, 1977.
 Member of the Board, Geisum Oil Company, 1988-1990.
 Member of the Board, Chamber of Petroleum and Mining, the Federation of Egyptian Industries, 1987-1990.
 Member, Refining and Processing Council, Academy of Science, Research and Technology, 1984-1990.
 Recipient of six international awards and honors.
 Holds B.Sc.Ch.E. from Cairo University, M.Ch.E and Ph.D. in Chemical Engineering  from University of Oklahoma. Licensed Consulting Engineer in the Design and Management of Chemical and Petroleum Projects. Elected Member of Sigma Xi Honorary Research Society. Author of several papers and UNIDO reports.

Books

عبور الفجوة التكنولوجية

References

Dr. Mustafa El-Rifai Official Website..

Living people
1934 births
20th-century Egyptian businesspeople
Trade and Industry ministers of Egypt